is a Japanese hammer thrower.

Career 
In 2017, she won bronze in 2017 Asian Athletics Championships, and gold in 101st Japan Championships in Athletics. In 2018, she won gold in 102nd Japan Championships in Athletics, and bronze in 2018 Asian Games.

References

1994 births
Living people
Japanese female hammer throwers
Asian Games bronze medalists for Japan
Asian Games medalists in athletics (track and field)
Athletes (track and field) at the 2018 Asian Games
Medalists at the 2018 Asian Games
Japan Championships in Athletics winners
21st-century Japanese women